Tell Sultan (also spelled Tall as-Sultan) is a town in northwestern Syria, administratively part of the Idlib Governorate, located southeast of Idlib and 37 kilometers southwest of Aleppo. Nearby localities include Abu al-Thuhur to the southeast, Tell Mardikh to the southwest, Saraqib to the west and Tell Touqan to the northwest. According to the Syria Central Bureau of Statistics, Tell Sultan had a population of 2,389 in the 2004 census.

History
Tell as-Sultan translates as the "Sultan's Hill." It received this name after the sultan of the Seljuks encamped at the hill during his siege of Aleppo in 1070 CE. Saladin and his Ayyubid army decisively defeated the Zengids army led by Ghazi II Saif ud-Din in a battle on the site of Tell Sultan in 1176.

The town was visited in the early 13th century by Syrian geographer Yaqut al-Hamawi who noted it was a "day's march from Halab (Aleppo) towards Damascus" and that it contained "a caravanserai and a rest-house for travelers." Later, in 1232, the regent queen of Aleppo, Dayfa Khatun received Fatima Khatun, the daughter of Ayyubid sultan al-Kamil, and Baha ad-Din ibn Shaddad at a ceremony in Tell Sultan.

References

Bibliography

 

Populated places in Idlib District